The UN Commission on Korea (UNCOK) was established in 1948 by the United Nations to deal with Korea. After the Second World War the peninsula had been divided between a Soviet occupied north and a non-communist south. The goal of UNCOK was to arrange for a withdrawal of foreign troops and a peaceful reunification of peninsula. With the outbreak of the Korean War it was replaced with the United Nations Command.

See also
UNCMAC – the UN Command Military Armistice Commission
UNCURK – the UN Commission for the Unification and Rehabilitation of Korea
Neutral Nations Supervisory Commission - the international Korean Armistice Agreement monitoring entity

References
 

Korean War
United Nations operations in Asia
North Korea–South Korea border
Aftermath of the Korean War
Organizations established in 1950